América Fútbol Club (usually called América) was a professional club. The club has won two First Division titles in the amateur era. The club is based in Caracas.

Honours
Primera División Venezolana: 2
Winners (2): 1921, 1923
Runner-up (1): 1922

External links
Venzóleo 

Football clubs in Venezuela
Football clubs in Caracas
Defunct football clubs in Venezuela